Zophar Mack Mansur (November 23, 1843 – March 28, 1914) was an American Civil War veteran, lawyer, banker, and politician who served as the 40th lieutenant governor of Vermont.

Early life
Mansur was born in Morgan, Vermont on November 23, 1843, the son of Warren and Jane A. (Morse) Mansur. He was educated at the Washington County Grammar School in Montpelier and graduated from the Derby Academy.

Civil War
He enlisted August 11, 1862, and mustered in as a corporal in Company K, 10th Vermont Infantry on September 1, 1862. He participated with his regiment in the Battle of the Wilderness, Spotsylvania, North Anna, Cold Harbor, Petersburg, Monocacy Junction and 3rd Winchester. He was wounded at Winchester on September 19, 1864, and lost his right arm. He was subsequently medically discharged on August 31, 1865.

Postwar life
In 1867 he married Ellen L. Newhill.  They were the parents of two children, Warren and Jane.

He served as postmaster in Island Pond, Vermont, from February 1867 to November 1885. He studied law with George N. Dale from 1870 to 1875 and was admitted to the bar in 1875. He practiced law until 1892, and became active in several businesses; in 1892 his lumber business became the main focus of his activities, and he practiced law less actively.  He was also a director of the National Bank of Derby Line from 1885 to 1905 when he became the bank's president.

A Republican, he was state's attorney of Essex County from 1886 to 1888. He represented Brighton in the Vermont House of Representatives from 1886 to 1888, serving on the judiciary committee and the committee on military affairs. From 1888 to 1890 he represented Essex County as a member of the Vermont State Senate. He served as Lieutenant Governor from 1894 to 1896.  He was appointed Collector of Customs for the Memphremagog District by President Benjamin Harrison in 1897, and he served until 1906.

He was a trustee of the Vermont Soldiers' Home in Bennington from its creation in 1884, and a trustee of the University of Vermont.  Fraternal organizations he was active in included the Sons of the American Revolution, Vermont Officers' Reunion Society, Grand Army of the Republic, and the Masons.

Death and burial
Mansur died in Burlington, Vermont on March 28, 1914.  He was buried at East Main Street Cemetery in Newport, Vermont.

See also
Vermont in the Civil War

References

External links
 Vermont Soldiers' Home

Sources
 Benedict, G. G., Vermont in the Civil War. A History of the part taken by the Vermont Soldiers And Sailors in the War For The Union, 1861-5, Burlington, VT: The Free Press Association, 1888, pp. ii:322.
 Fleetwood, Frederick G., Vermont Legislative Directory, Biennial Session, 1902, sited at www.ancestry.com.
 Dodge, Prentiss C., compiler. "Encyclopedia Vermont Biography," Burlington, VT: Ullery Publishing Company, 1912, pp. 257–258.
 Peck, Theodore S., compiler, ''Revised Roster of Vermont Volunteers and lists of Vermonters Who Served in the Army and Navy of the United States During the War of the Rebellion, 1861-66. Montpelier, VT.: Press of the Watchman Publishing Co., 1892, pp. 406.

1843 births
1914 deaths
People from Newport (city), Vermont
Lieutenant Governors of Vermont
People of Vermont in the American Civil War
Union Army soldiers
Republican Party members of the Vermont House of Representatives
Republican Party Vermont state senators
Vermont lawyers
State's attorneys in Vermont
19th-century American politicians
Burials in Vermont
19th-century American lawyers